Qareh Naz Rural District is in the Central District of Maragheh County, East Azerbaijan province, Iran. At the National Census of 2006, its population was 14,491 in 3,705 households. There were 15,720 inhabitants in 3,992 households at the following census of 2011. At the most recent census of 2016, the population of the rural district was 15,602 in 4,094 households. The largest of its 18 villages was Eslami Emam Reza Garrison, with 4,562 people.

References 

Maragheh County

Rural Districts of East Azerbaijan Province

Populated places in East Azerbaijan Province

Populated places in Maragheh County